The NXT Championship is a professional wrestling championship created and promoted by the American professional wrestling promotion WWE. It is defended as the top championship of the NXT brand division, the promotion's developmental territory. Introduced on July 1, 2012, the inaugural champion was Seth Rollins. The current champion is Bron Breakker, who is in his second reign.

The title was the first championship established for NXT. In September 2019, WWE began promoting NXT as its "third brand" when the NXT television program was moved to the USA Network. The NXT Championship was referred to as a world championship during this time; however, this recognition was dropped when NXT reverted to its original function as WWE's developmental brand in September 2021. In September 2022, the NXT United Kingdom Championship was unified into the NXT Championship.

History 

In June 2012, WWE established NXT as their developmental territory, replacing Florida Championship Wrestling (FCW). On July 1, the NXT Championship was introduced as the brand's top championship, as well as its first title, in turn replacing the FCW Florida Heavyweight Championship that had been retired along with the FCW territory. NXT Commissioner Dusty Rhodes announced an eight-man single-elimination tournament, dubbed the "Gold Rush" tournament, involving four wrestlers from NXT and four wrestlers from WWE's main roster competing to be crowned the first NXT Champion. On the July 26 taping of NXT (aired August 29), Seth Rollins defeated Jinder Mahal in the tournament final to become the inaugural champion. On November 19, 2016, at TakeOver: Toronto, Samoa Joe became the first performer to hold the championship on more than one occasion. 

In September 2019, the NXT brand became WWE's third major brand when it was moved to the USA Network. In 2017, after Drew McIntyre won the NXT Championship, the match description in the official title history referred to it as a world championship. Although the NXT Women's Championship became an option for the Royal Rumble match winner in 2020, it was not clear whether the NXT Championship could be chosen by men's winners. In 2021, it was revealed that the NXT Championship was an option for the men's Royal Rumble match winner to challenge for at WrestleMania 37, along with the WWE Championship and WWE Universal Championship. WWE revamped NXT in September 2021 and returned the brand to its original function as a developmental territory.

In August 2022, WWE announced that the NXT UK brand would go on hiatus and would relaunch as NXT Europe in 2023. As such, NXT UK's championship's were unified into their respective NXT championship counterparts. On September 4, 2022, at Worlds Collide, reigning NXT Champion Bron Breakker defeated NXT United Kingdom Champion Tyler Bate to unify the NXT United Kingdom Championship into the NXT Championship. Bate was recognized as the final NXT UK Champion, while Breakker went forward as the unified NXT Champion.

Inaugural tournament

Belt design

The original NXT Championship belt's design was simple: a large gold center plate shaped as the letter "X", with smaller letters "N" and "T" to the left and right of the center. The belt contained six total side plates, three sitting on either side of the center plate; each side plate only featured the WWE logo. When first introduced, the side plates had the WWE scratch logo but in August 2014, all of WWE's pre-existing championships at the time received a minor update, changing the scratch logo to WWE's current logo that was originally used for the WWE Network. The plates were on a large black leather strap. 

On WrestleMania Weekend 2017, all existing NXT title belts at the time were redesigned. The new title belts were unveiled at TakeOver: Orlando that same night and given to the winners of their respective matches. Like the previous design, the plates were gold and on a black leather strap. The letter "X" again dominated the center plate with smaller letters "N" and "T" sitting on the left and right sides, respectively. On this new design, however, the letters were on an octagonal shaped plate. Above the "X" was the WWE logo, while below the "X" was a banner that read "Champion". Simple ornamentation with some silver filled in the rest of the plate. Coming in line with the majority of WWE's other championships, the new design included side plates with a removable center section that could be customized with the champion's logo; the default plates featured the WWE logo.

On the April 5, 2022, episode of NXT 2.0, reigning champion Bron Breakker debuted a new belt design; it is largely similar to the previous version (2017–2022), but the silver behind the logo was replaced by multi-colored paint (matching the NXT 2.0 colorscheme) and the letters "N" and "T" on the center plate were updated to the font style of the NXT 2.0 logo. The default side plates were also updated, replacing the WWE logo with the NXT 2.0 logo. The new title retains the black leather strap.

Reigns 

The inaugural champion was Seth Rollins. Samoa Joe has the most reigns at three. Adam Cole's reign is the longest singular reign at  days (recognized as  days by WWE due to tape delay), while Karrion Kross' first reign is the shortest at 4 days (recognized as 3 days by WWE) as he had to relinquish the title due to a legitimate injury he suffered in winning it. Finn Bálor has the longest combined reign at 504 days. Bo Dallas holds the record as the youngest champion, winning the title two days before his 23rd birthday (although WWE recognizes it was 18 days after his 23rd birthday due to tape delay), while Samoa Joe is the oldest champion, winning the title at 42.

Bron Breakker is the current champion in his second reign. He defeated Dolph Ziggler on the April 4, 2022, episode of Raw in Dallas, Texas; this was the first time that the title changed hands on one of WWE's main roster television programs.

Notes

References

External links 
 Official NXT Championship Title History

WWE NXT championships